Collomia rawsoniana is a species of flowering plant in the phlox family known by the common name flaming trumpet. This perennial wildflower is endemic to California, where it is known from only two counties: Mariposa and Madera.  It grows in the woodland understory in the Sierra Nevada foothills. This plant produces a thin, erect stem to about half a meter in height with widely spaced, deeply toothed hairy leaves each several centimeters long. Atop the stem is an inflorescence of three to seven showy red-orange flowers. Each flower is up to 4 centimeters long and trumpet-shaped, with a protruding pistil and stamens tipped with anthers covered in blue pollen.

The species name commemorates the collector of its type material, Lucy Adeline Briggs Cole Rawson Peckinpah Smallman.

References

External links
Jepson Manual Treatment
Photo gallery

rawsoniana
Flora of California